Roberto António Victor Francisco de Almeida (born 5 February 1941) is an Angolan politician. He served as the President of the National Assembly of Angola from 1996 to 2008.

Besides being a politician, Almeida is also an established writer, under the pseudonym Jofre Rocha.

References 

1941 births
People from Bengo Province
Members of the National Assembly (Angola)
Presidents of the National Assembly (Angola)
Living people
MPLA politicians